Carlo Semenza (Milan, 9 Jul 1893 – Venice, 30 Oct 1961) was an Italian hydraulic engineer and mountaineer, considered one of the most experienced designers and manufacturers of dams in the era. 

He was the designer of 15 major dams, amongst them the Vajont Dam, the highest dam in the world until the early 1960s. The dam, however, withstood this tsunami virtually undamaged and held the rest of the threatening mudslide back. Semenza was subsequently posthumously exonerated by the court of L'Aquila from responsibility in causing the catastrophe.

Biography 
Semenza was present at the inauguration of the Vajont Dam, which was to be his last work before retirement. On the morning of Sunday 29 October 1961, he suffered a cerebral hemorrhage in his home, shortly after returning from mass in Lido di Venezia, and died the following morning. He was buried in Venice. 

At SADE his role was filled by the engineer Alberico Biadene, his deputy. 

In respect of the Vajont Dam disaster, the court of L'Aquila exonerated him posthumously.

Works 
His works are listed below in chronological order:

Large dams
 Earth dam for the expansion of Lake Santa Croce (1938);
 Sottosella Dam, on the Isonzo, former Yugoslavia (1940);
 Ghirlo Dam, on the Cordevole (1940);
 Dam of Sauris, on Lumiei (1947);
 Bau Mandara Dam, on the Flumendosa (1949);
 Dam of Pieve di Cadore, on the Piave (1949);
 Dam of Val Gallina, on the homonymous torrent (1951);
 Dam of Valle di Cadore, on the Boîte (1952);
 Barcis Dam, on the Cellina (1954);
 Dam de La Stua, on the Caorame stream (1954);
 Pian di Fedaia Dam, on the Avisio (1956);
 Dam of Pontesei, on the Maè (1956);
 Ambiesta Dam, on the homonymous stream (1960);
 Vajont Dam, on the homonymous stream (1960);
 Vodo di Cadore Dam, on the Boîte (1960);
 Dam of the Mis, on the homonymous stream (1960).

Hydroelectric power stations
 Doblari
 Agordo
 Plava
 La Stanga
 Ampezzo 
 Carnico (central Giuseppe Volpi)
 Soverzene (central Achille Gaggia)
 Barcis
 Malga Ciapela
 Somplago
 Gardona
 Colomber

Intake works and channels
 Taken on the Piave in Soverzene
 "Cellina" channel from Piave, Lake Santa Croce
 Negrisiola-Carron Canal
 Friga siphon
 Derivation of the Novarza

References 

 

1893 births
1961 deaths
20th-century Italian engineers
University of Padua alumni
Engineers from Milan